The Gospel Church, commonly referred to as the Fucheng Christian Church, is a Protestant church situated on Jiefang Street in Fucheng District, Mianyang. It was first built in 1895 and was originally an Anglican church belonging to the Church of England (after 1912 forming part of the Anglican-Episcopal Province of China). After the communist takeover of China in 1949, Christian Churches in China were forced to sever their ties with respective overseas Churches, which has thus led to the merging of Gospel Church into the communist-established Three-Self Patriotic Church.

History 

Protestantism was first introduced to Mianyang (then known as Mienchow [Mianzhou]) around 1894, by Church Missionary Society missionaries, an evangelical organisation belonging to the Church of England. In 1895, a church was built on Tongsheng Street (now Jiefang Street), whilst establishing the Diocese of Szechwan. During the Republican Era (1912–1949), Tongsheng Street (literally 'Street of All Saints'), as its name suggests, that brought together three religious buildings: the Confucian Temple dedicated to Confucius, the Wenchang Palace for the Taoist deity Wenchang Wang, and the Anglican Church of Jesus Christ.

The original church is built in the traditional local courtyard house style, covering an area of 2800 square metres. The missionaries also established the Yoh Teh School in nearby Huangjiaxiang (Huangjia Alley), Hua Ying Middle School in Nanshan subdistrict, as well as Yung Shêng Sweet Factory, a dairy factory, a nursery, et cetera. In 1954, the communist government established the 'self-governance, self-support, and self-propagation' Three-Self Patriotic Church, various Christian denominations in China would eventually sever their ties with overseas Churches. Under this policy, the then pastor Tiexia Zheng led his congregation to establish the 'Mianyang Christian Three-Self Reform Movement Committee', and since then the church embarked on the 'three-self road'.

After the 1990s, as the number of believers has increased, the church was rebuilt on original site, on the occasion of its centenary. The new church is a two-storey building covering an area of 1200 square metres, which is built in the fusion of neo-Gothic and Minimalist architectural styles, with a slightly Baroque flavour. As of 2016, the congregation consists of three pastors, twenty-six volunteer preachers, and about eight thousand baptised Christians, as well as thirty meeting points.

See also 
 Anglicanism in Sichuan
 Gospel Church, Jiangyou
 Gospel Church, Kangding
 Gospel Church, Wanzhou
 Our Lady of Lourdes Church, Mianyang

References

External links 
 Original Gospel Church, or known as Mienchow Mission House at Cambridge Digital Library
 Interior of the original Mienchow Church at Cambridge Digital Library

19th-century Anglican church buildings
19th-century churches in China
Churches completed in the 1890s
Churches completed in the 1990s
Protestant churches in China
Churches in Mianyang
Mianyang
Former Church of England church buildings
Rebuilt churches
Traditional Chinese architecture
Mianyang